Triumph Church is a Christian multi-site church located in Detroit, Michigan, USA. It was founded in the Fall of 1920 by Reverend Claude Cummings as the Triumph Missionary Baptist Church. Reverend Solomon W. Kinloch, Jr. is currently the Senior Pastor.  The church has six weekend and three midweek services and its average attendance makes it one of the largest churches in Detroit and Michigan.

In the last few years, the church has been recognized for its rapid growth. According to Outreach Magazine, it was the 3rd fastest growing church in the United States in 2008, with more than 2,000 new members formalizing a commitment to the church. That growth has continued through 2013, when the church topped the same list with 3,800 new members.

Locations 
Triumph is also a multi-site church, currently providing nine weekly worship services at five different sites in Metro Detroit. 

In addition to its worship facility in the New Center, Detroit area of Detroit (known as the East Campus).

Additional Sunday worship services are held at Canton High School in Canton, Michigan and at the Millennium Centre (known as the North Campus) in Southfield, Michigan.

In January 2010, Triumph relocated some of its services, which had been held at Cass Technical High School's 1100-seat auditorium, to the 2,700-seat Detroit Opera House.

Worship style 
Though Triumph traces its beginnings to the Missionary Baptists organization, as part of the "seeker sensitive" movement it does not publicize its traditional "Baptist" ties as research indicates new believers are less drawn to traditional forms church activities and worship.

Leadership 
Solomon Kinloch, Jr. is the senior pastor of Triumph Church. He has been a minister since the age of 14, at the New Bethel Baptist Church in Detroit, Michigan. In 1998, Rev. Kinloch accepted the call to Pastor at Triumph Baptist Church, in Detroit, Michigan.

Kinloch served on the board of the Southern Christian Leadership Conference and the New Market Tax Credit Advisory Board.

History 
In the fall of 1920, Reverend Claude Cummings organized the Triumph Missionary Baptist Church. In 1924, while located underground in a wood-frame structure at 515 Holford Street in River Rouge, Michigan, the church was officially incorporated.

Cummings was succeeded by the Reverend L.A. Forte, Reverend Rosbrior, Reverend F. Freeman, Reverend Scott and Reverend G.W. Sims respectively. In 1941, Reverend A.D. Boone, who had been a member for twenty years, accepted the call to pastor Triumph.

It was under the leadership of Boone that members marched to the new church in 1954 and one of its current locations, underground at 2550 South Liddesdale in Detroit. After the death of Boone in 1969, Freeman re-assumed pastoral duties until Reverend David DeYampert took over in 1970.

Under DeYampert, Triumph‘s membership grew from approximately 300 members to over 1,200. Construction of a new edifice on the same site began in March 1974. The following September, members began worshiping in the new sanctuary. By June 1988, members held a special service to celebrate full payment of the mortgage.

From 1989 to 1997, Triumph faced difficult times as the membership dwindled from its highpoint of over 1,200 to only 44. In addition to the struggles facing the church, Pastor DeYampert died on July 2, 1997. Earlier the next year on March 22, 1998, Triumph Church appointed a then-24-year-old Solomon Kinloch, Jr as its next pastor.

Under Kinloch membership has expanded from forty-four members to nearly 20,000. To accommodate this growth, Triumph Church made a decision to transition into a Multi-site church by adding additional services on Sunday, Tuesday, Wednesday and Saturday at various sites.

2010–present 
In 2012, Triumph reached an agreement to take ownership of the former ROC ministry campus, spread over more than 20-acres in Northville Township, just minutes away from western suburbs like Plymouth, Livonia, Novi, & Canton. This became the church's new West Campus.

In October 2014, Triumph negotiated with the former St. Martha’s Episcopal Church -- built by automobile mogul Henry Ford and his wife Clara -- to purchase the 22,000-square-foot church on Detroit's westside to become Triumph's Central Campus. The site is also the gravesite of Ford and many of his family members. 

In the summer of 2015, the church assumed ownership of the former Heart Academy charter school & St Peter Catholic Church in Harper Woods to become its new Eastland Campus (appropriately named as it is adjacent to the Eastland Center mall). 

In the fall of 2015, Triumph Church partnered with North Star Ministries and its retiring pastor, Bishop James Flowers, to assume ministry operations and financial obligations for the long-time Flint-area church. The new combined church became the Triumph Church - Flint Campus.

Recognition 

In 2009, Outreach Magazine named Triumph the third fastest growing church in the United States, with over 2,000 new members during the 2008 calendar year.

In 2012, Outreach Magazine named Triumph one of the Top 100 Largest churches in the United States, with nearly 10,000 in attendance each week.

References

External links 
 Triumph Church OFFICIAL Website

Baptist churches in Michigan
Churches in Detroit
Evangelical churches in Michigan
Evangelical megachurches in the United States
Christian organizations established in 1920